The Ōmachi Dam is a concrete gravity dam on the  just west of Ōmachi in Nagano Prefecture, Japan. Construction of the dam began in 1975 and it was completed in 1985. The primary purpose of the dam is water supply and it also supports a 13 MW hydroelectric power station. It is owned by TEPCO.

See also

Shin-Takasegawa Pumped Storage Station - upstream

References

Dams in Nagano Prefecture
Hydroelectric power stations in Japan
Gravity dams
Dams completed in 1985